Looney Tunes Golden Collection: Volume 2 is a DVD box set that was released by Warner Home Video on November 2, 2004. It contains 60 Looney Tunes and Merrie Melodies cartoons and numerous supplements.

Related releases
As with Volume 1, the individual discs were released separately in Region 4:
Disc 1: Best of Bugs Bunny - Volume 2
Disc 2: Best of Road Runner
Disc 3: Best of Tweety and Sylvester
Disc 4: All-Stars - Volume 3
In Region 1, discs 3 and 4 were also released separately as the more family-friendly Looney Tunes Spotlight Collection: Volume 2.

Disc 1: Bugs Bunny Masterpieces
All cartoons on this disc star Bugs Bunny.

Special features

Audio bonuses 
 Music-only audio tracks on Hyde and Hare
 Music-and-effects-only audio track on Broom-Stick Bunny, Bunny Hugged, Baby Buggy Bunny
 Audio commentaries
Bill Melendez on The Big Snooze
June Foray on Broom-Stick Bunny
Greg Ford on Bugs Bunny Rides Again, The Heckling Hare
Jerry Beck on Gorilla My Dreams
Michael Barrier on Tortoise Beats Hare, Slick Hare
Chuck Jones on Tortoise Beats Hare

From the Vaults
 The Bugs Bunny/Looney Tunes 50th Anniversary Special: Part 1
 The Bugs Bunny Show: Do or Diet bridging sequences; No Business Like Slow Business audio recording sessions with Mel Blanc

Behind-the-Tunes
 A Conversation With Tex Avery

Disc 2: Road Runner and Friends
All cartoons on this disc are directed by Chuck Jones.

Special features

Audio bonuses 
 Music-only audio tracks on Guided Muscle, Gee Whiz-z-z-z-z-z-z, There They Go-Go-Go!, Scrambled Aches, Zoom and Bored
 Music-and-effects-only audio track on A Bear for Punishment
 Audio commentaries
Michael Barrier on Beep, Beep, The Dover Boys at Pimento University or 'The Rivals of Roquefort Hall''', A Bear for PunishmentGreg Ford on Stop! Look! And Hasten!, Whoa, Be-Gone!, Mouse WreckersFrom the Vaults
 Adventures of the Road-Runner 1962 television pilot
 The Bugs Bunny/Road Runner Show 1968 opening title sequence

Behind-the-Tunes
 Crash! Bang! Boom!: The Wild Sounds of Treg Brown: A look at Termite Terrace's sound effects man, Treg Brown, and how he created the iconic sound effects heard in many Looney Tunes and Merrie Melodies cartoons.

Disc 3: Tweety and Sylvester and Friends

Special features
Audio Track
Music-and-Effects Only Audio Tracks for Tweet Tweet Tweety and A Bird in a Guilty CageAudio commentaries
 Greg Ford on Ain't She Tweet, Tweetie Pie Michael Barrier on Kitty Kornered, Baby Bottleneck, Porky in Wackyland Jerry Beck and Martha Sigall on Old Glory John Kricfalusi on The Great Piggy Bank RobberyFrom the Vaults
 Bonus cartoon: Daffy Duck for President (An all-new Daffy Duck cartoon released to tie in with the 2004 Election)
 The Bugs Bunny/Looney Tunes 50th Anniversary Special: Part 2
 The Porky Pig Show opening title sequence
 The Bugs Bunny & Tweety Show 1988 and 1992 opening title sequences

Behind-the-Tunes
 The Man From Wackyland: The Art of Bob Clampett

Disc 4: Looney Tunes All-Stars: On Stage and Screen

Special features

Audio bonuses
 Music-only audio tracks on Three Little Bops, One Froggy Evening, and What's Opera, Doc? Vocals-only audio tracks on Three Little Bops and What's Opera, Doc? Audio commentaries
Greg Ford on Back Alley Oproar, Hollywood Steps Out, and Show Biz BugsMichael Barrier on Book Revue, A Corny Concerto, and One Froggy EveningJerry Beck and Stan Freberg on Three Little BopsDaniel Goldmark on Rhapsody Rabbit and What's Opera, Doc?Chuck Jones, Michael Maltese, and Maurice Noble on What's Opera, Doc?Jerry Beck on You Ought to Be in PicturesBehind-the-Tunes
 Looney Tunes Go Hollywood
 It Hopped One Night: A Look at One Froggy Evening Wagnerian Wabbit: The Making of What's Opera, Doc?From the Vaults
 Orange Blossoms for Violet (1952) - short live action movie with dubbed-animals only.
 Academy Award-winning So Much for So Little (1949).

Release and reception
Warner Home Video was not sure that Looney Tunes Golden Collection: Volume 1 would sell well enough to justify a second release in the series. Prior to the release of the second volume, WHV's Vice President of Non-Theatrical Franchise Marketing announced: "We are extremely pleased with consumer response to last year's Volume One editions and we are delighted to release another installment of our most famous animated classics."

The first set in the Looney Tunes Golden Collection series had won the Classic Award at the Parents' Choice Awards, and the second release was also an award-winner. TVShowsOnDVD.com reported that the set won the award for "Best Animated Series" release at the 3rd Annual TV-DVD Conference. In The New York Sun, author and critic Gary Giddins complained that this set, like the first one, was skimpy with the black-and-white shorts, and seemed to avoid the more politically incorrect cartoons in the series. When his review was reprinted in the book, Natural Selection, Giddins noted that Looney Tunes Golden Collection: Volume 3 made up for the latter shortcoming by including some of the racist caricature in the series, preceded by an explanatory introduction by Whoopi Goldberg.

In a review reprinted in Syracuse, New York's The Post-Standard, Randy Salas, a critic for the Minneapolis, St. Paul Star Tribune, called the second volume in the Looney Tunes Golden Collection series a "glorious release". Salas describes the main content of the set, highlighting contributions from Chuck Jones and Friz Freleng with particular emphasis on Jones' One Froggy Evening'' (1955). The extras highlighted in the review include commentary from music historian Daniel Goldmark, and interviews with Chuck Jones, who had died in 2002. The review summed up, "This is an essential set for any animation fan, and it might just convert many who are not." The reviewer concluded by pointing out that a 2-disc "Spotlight Collection" with selections from the 4-disc set was also available, but advised, "Skip it and go for the full course."

See also
 Looney Tunes and Merrie Melodies filmography
 Looney Tunes and Merrie Melodies filmography (1929–1939)
 Looney Tunes and Merrie Melodies filmography (1940–1949)
 Looney Tunes and Merrie Melodies filmography (1950–1959)
 Looney Tunes and Merrie Melodies filmography (1960–1969)
 Looney Tunes and Merrie Melodies filmography (1970–present and miscellaneous)

References

Looney Tunes home video releases